The Kids Are Coming is the debut extended play by Australian singer Tones and I. The EP was released on 30 August 2019. The EP was announced on 16 July 2019, alongside the release of single "Never Seen the Rain". At the ARIA Music Awards of 2019, the EP won ARIA Award for Best Independent Release. At the AIR Awards of 2020, the EP was nominated for Best Independent Pop Album or EP. All six songs from the EP were later included on the deluxe edition of Tones and I's debut album, Welcome to the Madhouse (2021).

Track listing
All songs are written by Toni Watson and produced by Konstantin Kersting.

Personnel
Credits adapted from AllMusic.

 Toni Watson – composer, producer
 Konstantin Kersting – mixing, production
 Kenny Harmon – mixing
 Randy Belculfine – mixing
 Andrei Eremin – mastering

Charts

Weekly charts

Year-end charts

Certifications

Release history

References

2019 debut EPs
Tones and I EPs
ARIA Award-winning albums
Sony Music EPs